MJD may refer to:

 Modified Julian Date, see 
 Machado–Joseph disease
 Maurice Jones-Drew, former NFL running back
 Mizo Janata Dal, an Indian political party
 Moenjodaro Airport (IATA: MJD), Sindh, Pakistan
 Democratic Progressive Party, Chinese transliteration of "Minjindang"